Potamal is a technical geographical term of limnology and hydrology of the lower stretches of a stream or river.  It describes the overall habitat, stability and ecology of the biomass.

Further reading
 The FILION ., Pienitz R., "Physical Geography: Natural environments" General Documents, Winter 2007, Université Laval, pp 30–31.

Geography terminology
Hydrology